The Roman Catholic Diocese of Pembroke (erected 11 July 1882, as the Vicariate Apostolic of Pontiac) is a suffragan of the Archdiocese of Ottawa. It was elevated as the Diocese of Pembroke on 4 May 1898. The Cathedral of St. Columbkille in Pembroke is the mother church of the Diocese of Pembroke.

Bishops

Ordinaries
Narcisse Zéphirin Lorrain (1882–1915)
Patrick Thomas Ryan (1916–1937)
Charles Leo Nelligan (1937–1945)
William Joseph Smith (1945–1971)
Joseph Raymond Windle (1971–1993)
Brendan Michael O'Brien (1993–2000), appointed Archbishop of Saint John's, Newfoundland 
Richard William Smith (2002–2007), appointed Archbishop of Edmonton, Alberta
Michael Mulhall (2007–2019), appointed Archbishop of Kingston, Ontario
Guy Desrochers, C.Ss.R. (2020-)

Coadjutor bishop
Joseph Raymond Windle (1969–1971)

Auxiliary bishop
Patrick Thomas Ryan (1912–1916), appointed Bishop here

Other priests of this diocese who became bishops
 Élie Anicet Latulipe, appointed Vicar Apostolic of Temiskaming, Ontario in 1908
 James Matthew Wingle, appointed Bishop of Yarmouth, Nova Scotia in 1993

Educational Institutions 
 Renfrew County Catholic District School Board

Cemeteries
 St. Columba's Cemetery (Pembroke)

Territorial losses

Bibliography

References

External links

Diocese of Pembroke website
St. Columbkille's Cathedral website

Pembroke
Religious organizations established in 1882
Pembroke